Disha Parmar Vaidya (born 11 November 1994) is an Indian actress who works in Hindi television. She made her acting debut in 2012 and is known for her portrayal of Pankhuri Gupta in Pyaar Ka Dard Hai Meetha Meetha Pyaara Pyaara. She earned wider recognition with her portrayal of Priya Sood in Bade Achhe Lagte Hain 2.

Early life
Parmar was born on 11 November 1994 in New Delhi. She completed her schooling from Sadhu Vaswani International School, Delhi. During her higher secondary education, she participated in dance competitions, plays and fashion shows.

Parmar appeared in several print and commercial ads in Delhi. She was pursuing a degree in Business Marketing but left her under graduate studies midway as she was selected for Pyaar Ka Dard Hai Meetha Meetha Pyaara Pyaara.

Personal life
Singer Rahul Vaidya proposed Parmar on her birthday, during his stint on Bigg Boss 14. Parmar married Vaidya on 16 July 2021 in Mumbai.

Career

For a year, Parmar worked at the Delhi-based company Elite Model Management India Pvt. Ltd and organised the auditions for Rajshri Productions.

She enrolled for the auditions and was selected for the lead role of Pankhuri in Pyaar Ka Dard Hai Meetha Meetha Pyaara Pyaara. She was 17 at the time. She has received praise for her pairing with co-star Nakuul Mehta. She continued working in commercials along with the serial.

In 2016, Parmar featured in the web series I Don't Watch TV, released by Arré. In 2017, she played the lead role of Jhanvi/Jia in Zee TV's daily soap Woh Apna Sa.

She featured in music videos "Yaad Teri" and "Madhanya" both with Rahul Vaidya. Later she was seen in Box Cricket League as player in 2014. She was also a guest on Bigg Boss 14 to meet boyfriend Rahul Vaidya on Valentine's Day.

Since August 2021, Parmar has portrayed Priya in Ekta Kapoor's Bade Achhe Lagte Hain 2. She received positive reviews for her performance and her chemistry with Mehta is widely appreciated.

Filmography

Television

Special appearances

Web series

Music videos

Awards and nominations

See also
 List of Hindi television actresses
 List of Indian television actresses

References

External links

 
 

Living people
1994 births
Actresses from Delhi
Indian television actresses
Indian soap opera actresses
Indian web series actresses
Actresses in Hindi television
Female models from Delhi
21st-century Indian actresses